Colonel James Archibald Stuart, later Stuart-Wortley-Mackenzie (19 September 1747 – 1 March 1818), British politician and soldier, was the second son of John Stuart, 3rd Earl of Bute and his wife Mary Stuart, Countess of Bute.

On 8 June 1767 he married Margaret Cunynghame, daughter of Sir David Cunynghame, 3rd Baronet, and they had five children:
John Stuart-Wortley (1773–1797)
James Stuart-Wortley-Mackenzie, 1st Baron Wharncliffe (1776–1845)
Mary Stuart-Wortley (d. 9 March 1855), married on 1 June 1813 William Dundas (d. 1845)
Louisa Harcourt Stuart-Wortley (October 1781 – 31 January 1848), married in London on 22 June 1801 George Percy, 2nd Earl of Beverley, later Duke of Northumberland
George Stuart-Wortley (1783–1813)

A colonel in the Bedfordshire militia, he raised the 92nd Regiment of Foot in 1779, and was appointed lieutenant-colonel commanding. He brought it to the West Indies in 1780, and suffered severely in health. He returned home in 1783 and the regiment was disbanded, following the Treaty of Paris.

Upon the death of his mother, in 1794, he inherited the properties of the Wortley family, and assumed that surname on 17 January 1795. In 1800, he added the additional surname of Mackenzie, having succeeded to the estates of his uncle James Stuart Mackenzie.

References

1747 births
1818 deaths
Gordon Highlanders officers
Members of the Parliament of Great Britain for Scottish constituencies
Members of the Parliament of Great Britain for Plympton Erle
Members of the Parliament of the United Kingdom for Scottish constituencies
Younger sons of earls
Younger sons of barons
Children of prime ministers of the United Kingdom
Members of the Parliament of Great Britain for Bossiney
James
UK MPs 1806–1807
British MPs 1768–1774
British MPs 1774–1780
British MPs 1780–1784
British MPs 1784–1790
British MPs 1790–1796
British Militia officers